Barambo Ltd. is a Georgian confectionery manufacturer based in Natakhtari, Georgia. It was established by domestic investments in 2009. Since then, the company has begun manufacturing various products ranging from chocolate-based sweets to waffles, also exporting these to Azerbaijan, Armenia and Iraq.

Name
The company is named after the Georgian word for lemon balm.

References

Confectionery companies
Manufacturing companies of Georgia (country)
Food and drink companies established in 2009
Manufacturing companies established in 2009
2009 establishments in Georgia (country)
Brands of Georgia (country)